Several methods have been created to define an assessment process for free/open-source software. Some focus on some aspects like the maturity, the durability and the strategy of the organisation around the open-source project itself. Other methodologies add functional aspects to the assessment process.

Existing methodologies 
There are more than 20 different OSS evaluation methods.
 Open Source Maturity Model (OSMM) from Capgemini
 Open Source Maturity Model (OSMM) from Navica
 Open Source Maturity Model (OSSMM) by Woods and Guliani
 Methodology of Qualification and Selection of Open Source software (QSOS)
 Open Business Readiness Rating (OpenBRR)
 Open Business Quality Rating (OpenBQR)
 QualiPSo
 QualiPSo Model for Open Source Software Trustworthiness (MOSST)
 Towards A Trustworthiness Model For Open Source Software: How to evaluate Open Source Software
 QualOSS – Quality of Open Source
 Evaluation Framework for Open Source Software
 A Quality Model for OSS Selection
 Atos Origin Method for Qualification and Selection of Open Source Software (QSOS)
 Observatory for Innovation and Technological transfer on Open Source software (OITOS)
 Framework for OS Critical Systems Evaluation (FOCSE)

Comparison

Comparison criteria 
Stol and Babar have proposed a comparison framework for OSS evaluation methods. Their framework lists criteria in four categories: criteria related to the context in which the method is to be used, the user of the method, the process of the method, and the evaluation of the method (e.g., its validity and maturity stage).

The comparison presented below is based on the following (alternative set of) criteria:
 Seniority : the methodology birth date.
 Original authors/sponsors : original methodology authors and sponsoring entity (if any)
 License : Distribution and usage license for the methodology and the resulting assessments
 Assessment model :
 Detail levels : several levels of details or assessment granularity
 Predefined criteria : the methodology provides some predefined criteria
 Technical/functional criteria : the methodology permits the use of domain specific criteria based on technical information or features
 Scoring model :
 Scoring scale by criterion
 Iterative process : the assessment can be performed and refined using several steps improving the level of details
 Criteria weighting : it is possible to apply weighting on the assessed criteria as part of the methodology scoring model
 Comparison : the comparison process is defined by the methodology

Comparison chart

See also 

Free software
 Open source

References

External links
 OSMM from Capgemini
 OSMM from Navica
 QSOS
 OpenBRR
 Master thesis on open source selection (In danish)
 Enterprise Maturity Assessment Model (freeware) 
 Enterprise Architecture Maturity Assessment Model Software – freeware
 Official QualiPSo OMM webpages

Free computer programming tools